Men's 1 metre springboard event at the 2019 European Diving Championships was contested on 7 August.

Results
30 athletes participated at the event; the best 12 from the preliminary round qualified for the final.

Preliminary round

Final

References

M